{{Infobox college basketball team
|name = Colorado Buffaloes men's basketball
|current = 2022–23 Colorado Buffaloes men's basketball team
|logo = Colorado Buffaloes wordmark.svg
|logo_size = 200
|university = University of Colorado at Boulder
|conference = Pac-12
|location = Boulder, Colorado
|firstseason = 1901–02
|record = 1,294–1,197
|coach = Tad Boyle
|tenure = 13th
|arena = CU Events Center
|capacity = 11,064
|studentsection = C-Unit
|nickname = Buffaloes
|h_body = 000000
|h_pattern_b = _thinsidesonwhite
|h_shorts = 000000
|h_pattern_s = _blanksides2
|a_body = 000000
|a_pattern_b = _vegasgoldsides
|a_shorts = 000000
|a_pattern_s = _vegasgoldsides
|3_body = A2A4A3
|3_pattern_b = _thinblacksides
|3_shorts = A2A4A3
|3_pattern_s = _blacksides
|NCAAchampion = 
|NCAArunnerup = 
|NCAAfinalfour = 1942, 1955
|NCAAeliteeight = 1940, 1942, 1946, 1955, 1962, 1963
|NCAAsweetsixteen = 1940, 1942, 1946, 1954, 1955, 1962, 1963, 1969
|NCAAroundof32 = 1940, 1942, 1946, 1954, 1955, 1962, 1963, 1969, 1997, 2012, 2021
|NCAAtourneys = 1940, 1942, 1946, 1954, 1955, 1962, 1963, 1969, 1997, 2003, 2012, 2013, 2014, 2016, 2021
|conference_tournament = 2012
|conference_season = Mountain States Conference 1913, 1914, 1916, 1918, 1919, 1920, 1921, 1929, 1930, 1937, 1938, 1939, 1940, 1942

Big Seven/Eight 1954, 1955, 1962, 1963, 1969
}}

The Colorado Buffaloes men's basketball team represents the University of Colorado Boulder. The team competes in the Pac-12 Conference of NCAA Division I.  They are currently coached by Tad Boyle.

The Buffaloes have competed in fourteen NCAA Tournaments, making it to the Final Four in 1942 and 1955. Colorado has played in nine National Invitation Tournaments, winning the tournament in 1940 and making the semi-finals in 1991 and 2011. The Buffs won the Pac-12 conference tournament in 2012, their first season as a member.

Team history

The Silver & Gold become Buffaloes
The Colorado Men's Basketball team was initially known as the Silver and Gold, and began play on January 10, 1901, and beat State Prep School 34–10.  While unaffiliated their first few seasons, the school joined the Rocky Mountain Conference in 1909.  From 1902 to 1935, the school racked up a 200–151 record.

In 1934, the Silver and Gold became known as the Buffaloes.  CU students rented a buffalo calf to cheer the team on for the final football game that year, and the nickname stuck with the school since then.

The Frosty Cox era
The first coaching star for CU was Forrest B. "Frosty" Cox.  Cox spent 13 years on the sidelines from 1936 to 1950.  In his second season with the school, the Buffaloes joined the Mountain States Conference where they won four MSC titles.  Under Cox, the Buffs had quite a bit of success—both individually and as a team.  Cox had four All-Americans during his time with the Buffs – Jack Harvey (1939 & 1940), Jim Willcoxon (1939), Bob Doll (1942) and Leason McCloud (1942).  Cox lead the team to three NCAA tournament bids and two NIT bids while in Boulder.

Arguably the greatest team in CU Basketball history was the 1940 squad which not only got invited to the NCAA tournament but to the NIT tournament as well.  The Buffs won the more prestigious at the time NIT Tournament, which leads some to claim that the 1940 team was National Champs. In 1942, the Buffs lost in the NCAA Tournament Championship game to the Stanford Cardinal, which is the school's all-time best finish in that tournament.

In 1947, the Buffs left the Mountain States Conference and joined the Big Seven Conference.  When Cox concluded his CU career, he had the best win–loss percentage (62.3%) of any CU coach that was there for more than one season.

"The Big Burd" rules the court
After Cox left CU, Horace "Bebe" Lee took over as the Buffs head coach. He led the school to two NCAA Tournament bids, including a Third Place finish in the 1955 NCAA tournament.  However, the star of this era was Burdette "Burdie" Haldorson. Also known as "The Big Burd," Haldorson was arguably the best player in Colorado Men's Basketball history.  An All-American whose number is retired at CU, Haldorson was named to All-Big 7 Conference team two times and is also a member of the Basketball Hall of Fame, The Colorado Sports Hall of Fame, the University of Colorado Athletic Hall of Fame and the Pac-12 Basketball Hall of Honor.  He also won two gold medals with USA Basketball (1956 & 1960).

In 1955, Haldorson led the Big 7 Conference in scoring with 23.9 points per game as he led the Buffs to the third-place finish in the 1955 NCAA Tournament.

"Sox" Walseth leads The way
In 1956, CU named former player Russell "Sox" Walseth as their head coach.  Walseth graduated from CU in 1948 as a three-time letterman in both basketball and baseball for the Buffaloes, and came back to coach after stints at High School (Bakersfield, California) and South Dakota State.  "Sox" led the team to three Big 8 titles (the school joined the conference in 1958) and three NCAA tournament bids.  In both the 1961–62 & 1962–63 seasons, the Buffs reached the second round of the NCAA tournament before being eliminated by Cincinnati.

"Sox" had two All-Americans while at CU—Ken Charlton (1963) and Cliff Meely (1971).  Along with those two, another standout from "Sox"'s time at Boulder was Scott Wedman – a sharp-shooting forward from Denver's Mullen High School.  Wedman made a huge mark on the CU record books as he led the team in scoring and rebounding for two seasons, free throw percentage for one season and field goal percentage all three years he played at CU.  Those numbers placed him seventh in career scoring, sixth in rebounding and eighth in field goal percentage in CU history at the time he left the school.  He also was the highest draft pick in school history, going 2nd overall in the ABA Draft to the Memphis Sounds (he was also drafted 6th overall in the NBA draft by the KC-Omaha Kings).  Wedman went on to play 12 years in the NBA.

When he retired after twenty seasons, "Sox" was the all-time winningest coach in CU history with a 261–245 record.  Four years later, he came back to coach the women's team to a 77–21 record, including an incredible 43–0 home record, before retiring again.  In 1996, the CU Event Center basketball court was named after him, so the Buffs all play on "Sox Walseth Court" now.

Cliff Meely
The star of the program under "Sox" Walseth was undoubtedly Cliff Meely.  Walseth often called Meely "the most complete player" he had ever coached, and Meely set sixteen school records while playing for the Buffaloes and eight Big 8 Conference records.

Meely is the school's all-time leader in points and rebounds per game, and was named an All-American during the 1971 season.  The list of accolades he received while in Boulder is numerous, but along with being an All-American, in 1969 he was named both Big 8 Player of the Year and Big 8 Sophomore of the Year.  In fact, all three years he was at Colorado he was named to the All-Big 8 First Team.  Because of his dominant play, he was not only named to the 1970s Big 8 All-Decade First Team, but in 1996 he was named to the AP's All-time Big 8 Conference Basketball first team along with Wayman Tisdale (Oklahoma), Danny Manning (Kansas), Jo Jo White (Kansas) and Rolando Blackman (Kansas State).

Colorado has retired the #20 that he wore while in Boulder.

Individual talents lead the way
The lackluster results of Walseth's latter tenure would become the norm for Colorado over the next two decades. From 1977–78 to 1995–96, the Buffs would only have four winning seasons, and only once would even get to .500 in Big Eight play.

While the Buffs struggled record-wise in the '80s and early '90s, they did have a few individual standouts that brought the team national attention.  From 1980 to 1984, the Buffs were led by Jay Humphries, an exciting guard who made his mark all over CU's record book in just those three seasons.  On offense, he became the school's all-time assist leader and also finished fourth all-time in scoring.  Even with that though, Humphries was best known for his defense.  Humphries is the school's all-time leader in thefts and led the nation in steals in 1982–83 with 115.  Humphries was twice named Honorable Mention All-American (1982–83 & 1983–84) before being drafted by the Phoenix Suns with the thirteenth pick of the NBA draft. A teammate of Humphries in high school and at Colorado was post player Vince Kelley. Kelley also played with the Buffaloes from 1980 to 1984 and finished third all-time in career rebounds at CU. Kelly graduated in 1984 and played professionally in Australia and Portugal.

After starting out the '80s with talent like Humphries and Kelley, the Buffs found a way to round the decade out with two more stars to lead the team.  Shaun Vandiver was a transfer from Hutchinson CC who only played three years in Boulder, but when it was all said & done finished as the school's all-time leader in field goal percentage and was the school's second leading scorer & rebounder in history.  For his work, he was named Honorable Mention All-American in 1989–90 and was named Big Eight tournament MVP from a losing team after leading the 8th seeded Buffs to the Tournament Championship game before falling short – the first eight seed to ever make the championship game.

Vandiver wasn't alone on the team though as he had guard Stevie Wise there to help lead the way.  Wise played 119 games for the Buffs, the fifth most in school history. He was known for being one of CU's all-time great 3 point specialists and he holds numerous CU shooting marks.  He finished his time as the number three scorer in school history and is still in the top 10 for assists in school history.  Wise & Vandiver led the team on their run to the 1991 NIT Final Four.  It was the school's first postseason appearance since 1969, and when it was said & done, they got to cut down the nets in front of a standing room only crowd at the Events Center before heading to the NIT Final Four in NYC where they ended up third.

The next player to make his mark on the record books was Donnie Boyce.  The Illinois product spent four years at CU and when he left he was the school's all-time leading scorer with 1,995 points.  He was the first Buff to lead the team in scoring all four years at CU, and only the second Buff to ever do it.  While Boyce was lighting it up, the team struggled.  It appeared that Boyce was finally going to get to play in a postseason tournament in 1995, but he broke his leg in the opening round of the Big Eight tournament against Oklahoma.  The team went on to earn an NIT bid–their first postseason bid of any sort since 1969–but he was unable to play.

The Chauncey Billups years
The most beloved player in school history, Chauncey Billups is usually the first person that people think of when they think Colorado basketball. The three-time winner of Colorado's Mr. Basketball award and a member of the McDonald's All-American team his senior year, the Denver native could have gone anywhere in the nation to play college ball. Even though it was obvious he wouldn't be staying for the entire four years due to a pro career calling his name, he had no shortage of suitors. With all of that, he decided to stay close to home and enroll at CU.

In his first year at Colorado, he set a school record for points scored by a freshman and was named to the Big 8 All-Freshman team as well as the All-Big 8 Conference Second Team and the Kansas City Star Big 8 team—an honor that was voted on by the players themselves. Unfortunately, Chauncey's first year in Boulder was filled only with individual accolades as the team underperformed and head coach Joe Harrington was relieved of duties. His sophomore year however, Chauncey was able to get the team going. Behind new head coach Ricardo Patton, and in a new conference (the Big 12 Conference), Chauncey at one point had led the Buffs to a 14–3 record and the #18 ranking in the nation. This team would make the Buffs' first NCAA Tournament appearance in 28 years, and notched their first winning conference record in 24 years. They would upset Indiana in the first round before losing to North Carolina in the second round. For his work, Chauncey was named not only to the All-Big 12 Conference First Team, but was named an All-American as well.  Chauncey declared for the NBA draft, where he was picked third overall by the Boston Celtics, and he went on to play 17 years in the NBA.

The Buffs enter The Big 12
Once Chauncey left, the Buffs were faced with a rough conference slate, but still managed to have some success behind head coach Ricardo Patton.  Players such as Jaquay Walls (Big 12 All-Newcomer Team) and Jamahl Mosley helped lead the team to back-to-back NIT bids, but things started to improve once David Harrison showed up on campus for the 2001–02 season.  Harrison was named to the Big 12 All-Freshman team and lead the school in scoring, while also setting a school record with a field goal percentage of 63.8% – good enough for third nationally.  Harrison had help though in the form of Stéphane Pelle. Pelle was the first player in 11 years to average a double-double, putting up 12.8 points and 10.8 rebounds per game in the 2001–02 season.  The next season, with Harrison & Pelle down low and Michel Morandais coming in to form on the wing, the Buffs won 20 games and capped it off with an NCAA Tournament bid.  They made the NIT the next season after Harrison left early to go into the NBA draft.

New all-time scoring leaders
Richard Roby stepped on the CU campus in 2004 and became the first freshman since Chauncey Billups to lead the team in scoring and he ended up joining Donnie Boyce as the only Buffs to lead the team in scoring all four years on campus.  In his sophomore season, Roby & the Buffs won twenty games and ended up in the NIT Tournament, while also being named to the All-Big 12 First Team.  Unfortunately, he was faced with a freshmen laden team the next season, as there were eight first year players (a school record) on the 2006–07 squad.  The next season showed improvement and the Buffs became the first team in Big 12 history to be a 12 seed and upset a number 5 seed (Baylor) in the Big 12 Tournament.  When he finally graduated from CU, he left the school as the all-time leading scorer with 2,001 points—a record that still stands to this day.

But it is a record that is shared, because during his senior year, he shared time on the floor with a freshman named Cory Higgins who would one day tie him as the school's all-time leading scorer.  Higgins was more than just a scorer though as during his sophomore year he was one of only 13 players nationally to lead or finish second on his team in five major statistical categories—points, rebounds, assists, steals and blocked shots.  Higgins also found a way to rank nationally in steals, free throw percentage and scoring as well.  For his junior year, Higgins got some more help with the arrival of freshman guard Alec Burks.  Higgins & Burks became the first tandem to net over 500 points in the same season since the 1990–91 campaign and were rewarded as Higgins was named to the All-Big 12 Third Team and Burks was named All-Big 12 Freshman of the Year.

The Tad Boyle era
Tad Boyle was named the 18th coach in University of Colorado men's basketball history on April 19, 2010. In his first season in Boulder, Boyle led the Buffs to a school-record 18 home wins and their highest Big 12 finish (t-5th) since 2005–06. CU ranked first in the Big 12 and fifth nationally in free throw percentage (77.8) for the 2010–11 season. Boyle's efficient attack also ranked 12th nationally in scoring (79.6 ppg) and 19th nationally in field goal percentage (47.3).

Boyle earned National Coach of the Week honors (Hoops Report, Jan. 10–16) after leading the Buffs to a 3–0 conference start, including wins over No. 9/8 Missouri and No. 21/20 Kansas State. The win over the Wildcats gave CU its first road win over a nationally ranked opponent since defeating No. 20 Texas Tech in January 1997. For the season, CU defeated four ranked teams, including a comeback of 22 points down (ranking second all-time in school history) to upset No. 5/5 Texas, 91–89. Despite having a very solid season and getting to the semi-finals of the conference tournament, Boyle and the Buffs were snubbed of a bid in the NCAA tournament. CU ended up making it all the way to the NIT semi-finals but lost to Alabama.

In his second season at the helm Tad faced an uphill battle, losing 4 starters, 78% of the scoring and most notably Alec Burks to the NBA (#12 overall pick to the Utah Jazz). He was able turn all of this into his second 24 win season in a row, a Pac-12 tournament championship and a trip to the NCAA Tournament as a #11 seed where CU advanced to the round of 32 for the first time in 15 years after beating #6 seed UNLV 68–64 in Albuquerque. CU's magical run was ended by Baylor in the round of 32, but in just two seasons, Boyle became the most successful post-season coach in the history of Colorado Basketball.

The AllBuffs.com All-Time Men's Basketball Team
The users on AllBuffs.com had a vote in the summer of 2012 to decide who they considered to be the members of the "All-Time Men's Basketball Team" at the University of Colorado.  The players named were:
 Chauncey Billups – 1995–97
 Alec Burks – 2009–11
 Burdette Haldorson – 1951–55
 Jay Humphries – 1980–84
 Cliff Meely – 1969–71
 Jaquay Walls - 1998-00

Coaching

Current staff

Record by coach

¹ Invitations

Players

Retired numbers

Career leaders

Individual Awards

All-Americans1970's Big 8 Conference All-Decade Team Cliff Meely – First TeamBig 8 Conference Player of the Year 1969 – Cliff Meely
 Big XII Conference First Team 2000 - Jaquay WallsBig XII Conference Freshman of the Year 2010 – Alec BurksPac-12 Conference Defensive Player of the Year 2013 – Andre RobersonPac-12 Conference First Team 2012 & 2013 – Andre Roberson
 2013 – Spencer Dinwiddie
 2014 & 2016 – Josh Scott
 2017 – Derrick White
 2019 - Tyler Bey
 2019 & 2020 - McKinley Wright IVPac-12 Conference Second Team 2012 – Carlon Brown
 2015 – Askia Booker
 2018 – George KingPac-12 Conference Most Improved Player'''
 2019 - Tyler Bey

NBA Draft picks

Buffs in the NBA

Buffs in international leagues

Tyler Bey (born 1998), in the Israeli Basketball Premier League
 Marcus Relphorde (born 1988), in the Israeli National League

Post season

Big 8 Conference tournament
The Buffs went 4–20 in the Big 8 Conference tournament in their time in the conference.  Their best performance came in the 1990 season when they became the first #8 seed to make the conference championship game before falling to Oklahoma in the championship match.  For their effort, Shaun Vandiver was named Tournament MVP despite being on the losing team.

Big 12 Conference tournament
In their fifteen seasons in the Big 12, the Buffs managed to go 9–15 in Conference tournament play.  Despite not winning a conference championship, they do have two successful claims to fame during their time.  The first one was in 2008 when the Buffs became the first #12 seed to upset a #5 seed as they beat Baylor in the opening round.  The other one was during their last year in the conference when they beat Iowa State in the opening round and followed that up with their third win of the season over Kansas State before falling just short to Kansas in the semi-finals.

Pac-12 Conference tournament

2012 Pac-12 Tournament champions
The Buffs won their first conference tournament championship in 2012, their first year in the Pac-12 conference.  Led by tournament MVP Carlon Brown, the 6th-seeded Buffs won four games in four days to bring the championship back to Boulder and earn an invitation to the 2012 NCAA tournament where they would go on to beat UNLV in the second round before losing to Baylor in the third round.

NCAA tournament results
The Buffaloes have appeared in the NCAA Tournament 14 times, with a combined record of 11–17.

NIT
The Buffaloes have appeared in the National Invitation Tournament (NIT) 13 times. Their combined record is 14–12. They were NIT Champions in 1940.

CBI
The Buffaloes have appeared in the College Basketball Invitational (CBI) one time. Their record is 1–1.

Record vs. Pac-12 opponents
The Colorado Buffaloes have the following all-time series records vs. Pac-12 opponents. They lead the series vs. seven opponents.

Note all-time series includes non-conference matchups.

Facilities and fans

CU Events Center

The CU Events Center is an 11,064-seat multi-purpose arena on the Boulder main campus of the University of Colorado. The arena opened in 1979, and is home to the Colorado Buffaloes men's and women's basketball teams and the CU volleyball team.  The CEC opened in 1979 and the first game played there was the CU Men's Basketball team hosting the USSR basketball team.  The largest crowd ever to witness a game was on December 5, 2012, when 11,708 people watched CU play CSU (CU won the game 70–61).   The facility has also hosted its fair share of concerts as Bob Dylan, U2 and Stevie Wonder are some of the artists to have performed there.

The facility was originally named the CU Events/Conference Center and cost $7.7 million to build.  In September 1990, it was renamed the Coors Event Center to honor a $5 million gift from the Adolph Coors Foundation. In 2018, the name was changed to the CU Events Center.

Practice facility
In the fall of 2011, the school opened the doors on a brand new practice facility that is located right next to the CU Event Center.  This provides locker rooms and practice courts for the men's & women's basketball teams as well as the women's volleyball team.  The facility is 43,000 square feet and cost $10.8 million, all from private funds.  Each of the two practice courts are 11,000 square feet and are exact replicas of the CU Event Center—down to the lines and logos.  The school also took extra care to make sure that the facility matches the other 200-plus buildings on campus by using sandstone and red-tiled roofs.

The facility is also one of two athletic facilities to be given LEED Platinum Certification, which is the highest possible by the internationally recognized system developed by the US Green Building Council.  The facility is estimated to be 40% more energy efficient and 30% more water efficient than similar buildings to it.

C-Unit
The student section for CU Basketball is referred to as the C-Unit.  A grassroots organization that was started by a few students in 2004, the C-Unit has gone on to receive tons of praise for their ability to cheer the Buffs on.  They started getting attention nationally when the school sent 50 members to Los Angeles for the 2012 Pac-12 Tournament, and then upon getting a bid to the NCAA Tournament, the school sent 100 of them to The Pit in Albuquerque to cheer the team on in their victory over UNLV in the second round of the tournament.  The C-Unit, combined with the large number of CU fans who followed the team down for the weekend, turned The Pit into "Coors Event Center South".

References

External links